SO2 is an album released by Shinichi Osawa on June 30, 2010 and is the second studio album under his real name.

Track listing

 "Love Will Guide You" - 5:39 (feat. Tommie Sunshine)
 "Sylkill" - 3:35
 "Zingaro" - 5:49
 "Heart Goes Boom" - 3:49 (feat. The Black Ghosts)
 "Pianoctro" - 4:38
 "Technodluv" - 5:27
 "BUTTON!!" - 3:37
 "Singapore Swing" - 4:46 (feat. Paul Chambers)
 "BBG BBB" - 5:38
 "Morphy" - 5:23
 "Paris" - 4:46
 "London (Homes Not Where You Lay Your Head)" - 5:37
 "Thank You For Your Love" - 5:51

References
 toomanysebastians.net

2010 albums
Shinichi Osawa albums